The Samsung Galaxy S4 Zoom is a phone with camera hybrid with a 10x optical zoom (24–240 mm 35 mm equivalent) with f/3.1-6.3 lens with built-in optical image stabilizer and a standard xenon flash. It was introduced in July 2013.

The phone uses a Pega-Dual +XMM6262 SoC featuring a 1.5 GHz dualcore CPU. There is a base model, SM-C101, and a variant featuring LTE 4G, SM-C105.

Camera 

The S4 Zoom uses 1/2.33-inch 16 MP BSI-CMOS sensor and has both auto and manual camera control, and takes video in 1080p 30 fps (full HD) or 720p at smoother 60 fps. The device can be categorized as a low/mid-end point-and-shoot camera.

In one of the Scene modes, the user can set the exposure time, the ISO light sensitivity (up to ISO 3200), the aperture and the white balance manually, which the main Galaxy S4 variant lacks.

It can record slow motion videos at 768×512 pixels at 120 frames per second, compared to 800×450 on the main Galaxy S4 and 720×480 on the Galaxy Note 2 at that frame rate. Slow motion video is recorded without audio track. One can also use the optical zoom while recording. While recording video, at any available resolution and frame rate, the optical zoom can optionally be slowed down, to avoid recording the sound of the Zoom Lens Engine. This also applies to the succeeding Galaxy K Zoom.

While recording video, one can also take still images with around 3.2 megapixels, but only up to 6 pictures during the whole recording, no matter the length or the size of the video, even if this video is paused. Samsung has not given a reason for this limit.

The S4 Zoom has a rotary knob ring around the zoom lens that can be used for optical zooming and to launch the camera from a dedicated mode selector. The rotary ring knob can mount some compatible ring lights for macro photography.

Screen 
The screen has the same specifications as the S4 Mini, with a qHD (not to be confused with QHD) Display with 960×540 Pixels and a pixel Density of 256 ppi.  It uses Super-AMOLED-Technology, like most of Samsung's mid-range or flagship smartphones. It is protected with Gorilla Glass 3, unlike the Gorilla Glass 2 used on the Galaxy S3, Galaxy Note 2 and Galaxy S4 Active. The Galaxy S4 (main model) has Gorilla Glass 3 as well.

Galaxy K Zoom

In June 2014 the successor to the Galaxy S4 Zoom, the Galaxy K Zoom model (SM-C115) - also known as Galaxy S5 Zoom - was released. It comes with a 10x zoom camera (24-240mm) with 20.7 megapixels, with Android 4.4.2. The Galaxy K Zoom also utilizes the letter 'K' for "Kapture" or "Kamera". Its slogan is "Capture the Moment".

Its removable polycarbonate rear cover has the same dotted pattern as the Galaxy S5, and it shares the same version of TouchWiz (Nature UX 3.0).

Although lacking 4K (2160p) video, it supports video recording with 1080p at 60 frames per second and slow motion 720p at 120 frames per second, the latter without audio.

Its camera software features a "Pro Suggest" mode that automatically suggests the appropriate camera modes for the current scene.

The K Zoom has 2 GB RAM, 8 GB own flash, microSD, NFC, Wi-Fi, Bluetooth 4.0, 4.8 inch 1280×720 px Super AMOLED (306 ppi), 6-core Exynos 5 Hexa (Exynos 5260) SoC, Mali-T624 GPU, 200 g and 20.2 millimeters at thickest point.

It has additional camera controls such as the ability to separate focus and exposure areas.  A disadvantage in comparison to the S4 Zoom is that one can't use the Optical Zoom, while recording Slow Motion Videos.  The new design of the K Zoom also removed the camera tripod screw thread and the rotary ring around the zoom lens.

See also 
 Comparison of Samsung Galaxy S smartphones

References

External links 
 Galaxy S4 Zoom website
 Galaxy K Zoom website
 Retrospective review of the Galaxy S4 Zoom by GSMArena (2020)

Samsung mobile phones
Samsung Galaxy
Mobile phones introduced in 2013
Discontinued smartphones
Mobile phones with user-replaceable battery
Samsung digital cameras
Digital cameras with CMOS image sensor
Cameras introduced in 2013
Android cameras with optical zoom
Mobile phones with mechanical zoom lens
Mobile phones with infrared transmitter